Actinopus azaghal is a species of mygalomorph spiders in the family Actinopodidae. It can be found in Brazil.

The specific name azaghal refers to Deive "Azaghal" Pazos, a podcast producer.

References 

azaghal
Spiders of Brazil
Spiders described in 2020